Gilbert Amy (born 29 August 1936) is a French composer and conductor.

Career
Born in Paris, Amy entered the Conservatoire de Paris in 1954, where he was taught and influenced by Olivier Messiaen and Darius Milhaud and studied piano with Yvonne Loriod and fugue with Simone Plé-Caussade. His first composition (Œil de fumée) dates from 1955. In 1957 he met Pierre Boulez, under whose direction he composed his Piano Sonata. A year later Boulez commissioned from him a work called Mouvements, which was performed in Darmstadt by the Orchestre du Domaine musical. From 1958 to 1961 he attended the Darmstädter Ferienkurse given by Karlheinz Stockhausen.

In 1962 Jean-Louis Barrault named him adjunct music director of the Odéon Theater in Paris. At the same time he undertook a career as conductor in Europe and Argentina. Between 1967 and 1973 he was the director of the Domaine Musical, succeeding Pierre Boulez. From 1973 to 1975 he was music advisor to ORTF and worked to "reform" the music heard on the radio. From 1976 to 1981, he was music director of the Nouvel Orchestre Philharmonique of Radio France. In 1984, Amy succeeded Pierre Cochereau as Director of the Conservatoire National Supérieur de Musique at Lyon, while continuing to compose music. His notable students include Micheline Coulombe Saint-Marcoux and Jeffrey Brooks.

Amy's talent as a composer has won him a number of awards including the Grand Prix National de la Musique in 1979, the Grand Prix of SACEM in 1983, the Grand Prix Musical of the City of Paris in 1986 and the Prix of the President of the Republic from the Academy Charles Cros in 1987.

List of works

References

External links

Biography of Gilbert Amy, Radio France (in French)

1936 births
Musicians from Paris
French classical composers
French male classical composers
French male conductors (music)
Conservatoire de Paris alumni
Directors of the Conservatoire de Paris
Living people
Pupils of Darius Milhaud
Pupils of Karlheinz Stockhausen
Twelve-tone and serial composers
21st-century French conductors (music)
21st-century French male musicians